1031 may refer to:
 The year AD 1031
 1031 exchange, a transaction under United States law
 1031, A Number Of Things From..., an album by the Detroit band Halloween